The peso ley (ARY; unofficially ARL), usually known as either peso or, to distinguish it from the earlier peso moneda nacional, informally as peso ley, was the currency of Argentina between January 1, 1970, and May 5, 1983. It was subdivided into 100 centavos. Its symbol was $L, sometimes $. Its name comes from law 18188 which established it, effective April 5, 1969.

History
The peso ley replaced the peso moneda nacional at a rate of 100 to 1. It was itself replaced by the peso argentino at a rate of 10,000 to 1.

The history of the various successive Argentine currencies called peso is detailed in the article on the Argentine peso.

Coins
In 1970 coins were introduced in denominations of 1, 5, 10, 20 and 50 centavos. As inflation eroded the currency's value, higher denominations were introduced: 1 peso in 1974, 5 and 10 pesos in 1976, and 50 and 100 pesos in 1978.

Centavo

Peso

Banknotes
Banknotes were issued in the following denominations:

See also

La Década Perdida (The Lost Decade)
Latin American debt crisis

References

 
 
 

Currencies of Argentina
Peso ley
1970 establishments in Argentina
1983 disestablishments